Caffé Lavena is a café in the city of Venice, Italy.

It was established in 1750, and was originally called Regina d'Ungheria (the Queen of Hungary) under the Austro-Hungarian empire. The café has its origins in the popular Venice of the 17th century, it became later Orso Coronato (Crowned Bear) because of the picturesque sign showing a bear standing on his hind legs with a crown on its head. In 1860, Carlo Lavena bought the cafè and it has remained in his family ever since.

External links
 Official Site of Caffé Lavena

Buildings and structures in Venice
Coffeehouses and cafés in Italy